{{Infobox concert
| concert_tour_name = +-=÷× Tour
| image = Ed Sheeran mathematics tour dates.jpeg
| caption = European dates tour poster
| location = 
| artist = Ed Sheeran
| start_date = 
| end_date = 
| number_of_legs = 3
| number_of_shows = 89
| gross = 
| support_acts = 
| last_tour = ÷ Tour(2017–2019)
| this_tour = +-=÷× Tour(2022–2023)
| albums = =−
}}

The +–=÷× Tour (pronounced the Mathematics Tour) is the ongoing fourth concert tour by English singer-songwriter Ed Sheeran. Comprising 89 shows across three legs, the tour commenced on 23 April 2022 in Dublin, Ireland, and is scheduled to conclude on 23 September 2023 in Inglewood, California. The tour is in support of his fourth studio album, = (2021), and his upcoming fifth studio album, −'' (2023), scheduled to be released on 5 May 2023.

Background 
On 17 September 2021, Sheeran announced a 27-date European tour. As soon as tickets went on sale, dates were added to several dates across the tour due to overwhelming demand, bringing the overall number of shows to 64. On 15 March 2022, Sheeran announced the Oceania leg of the tour. Tickets are currently scheduled to go on-sale on 23 March 2022. On 22 March 2022, Sheeran added 3 shows to the Oceania leg of the tour; in Brisbane, Sydney, and Melbourne. On 15 June 2022, Sheeran added an additional 3 shows to the Oceania leg of the tour; in Wellington, Auckland, and Brisbane. On 20 September 2022, the additional Wellington show scheduled for 1 February 2023 was canceled citing on-going uncertainties affecting a number of different variables with global touring. In October 2022, Sheeran announced that the North American leg of the tour would occur in 2023.

Set list 
The following set list is obtained from the 21 March 2022 in London. It does not represent all dates throughout the tour.

 "Tides"
 "Blow"
 "I'm a Mess"
 "Shivers"
 "The A Team"
 "Castle on the Hill"
 "2step"
 "Tenerife Sea"
 "First Times"
 "Visiting Hours"
 "Own It" / "Peru" / "Beautiful People" / "I Don't Care"
 "Overpass Graffiti"
 "Galway Girl"
 "Thinking Out Loud"
 "The Joker and the Queen"
 "Perfect"
 "Bloodstream"
 "Afterglow"
Encore
  "Shape of You"
 "Bad Habits"
 "You Need Me, I Don't Need You"

Tour dates

Cancelled shows

Notes

References 

Ed Sheeran concert tours
2022 concert tours
2023 concert tours
Concert tours
Concert tours of Europe
Concert tours of Oceania